TrackMania 2 (stylized as TrackMania²) is a racing video game developed by Nadeo and published by Ubisoft as part of the TrackMania series.

Gameplay
TrackMania2 features gameplay similar to that of previous games in the series. The player can race on various tracks, with the ability to do stunts in various modes, including a championship and a cooperative mode. The track editor from previous games also returned. A new "ManiaScript" is being created to help players add new features in the game. As the game's popularity grew, players began uploading complicated custom built courses onto YouTube showcasing their creativity.

Episodes

The release of TrackMania2: Canyon was through a combination open-beta/preorder available on 17 August 2011. This allowed those who pre-ordered access into the multiplayer beta, to get the remainder of the features automatically activated upon the game's official release on 14 September 2011. On 27 February 2013, the game was also released on Steam along with the new installment of the series, TrackMania2: Stadium. TrackMania2: Canyon includes a single new environment for the series: Canyon. At the moment TrackMania2: Canyon features 2 official gameplay modes: Race and Platform.

TrackMania2: Canyon was followed by TrackMania2: Stadium and TrackMania2: Valley in 2013 and then TrackMania2: Lagoon in 2017.

References

External links

Official Maniaplanet website

2011 video games
Episodic video games
Multiplayer and single-player video games
Split-screen multiplayer games
Multiplayer online games
Racing video games
Video games with Steam Workshop support
Ubisoft games
Video games developed in France
Windows games
Windows-only games
TrackMania